Charles Edwin may refer to:

 Charles Edwin (died 1756), Welsh politician, MP for Westminster 1741–47, for Glamorgan 1747–56
 Charles Edwin (died 1801), Welsh politician, MP for Glamorgan 1780–89

See also 
 Edwin (surname)